Fuad Salihović (born 2 November 1985) is a Serbian football midfielder.

Born in Novi Pazar, Salihović played with FK Javor Ivanjica in the Second League of FR Yugoslavia before joining once a usual participant in the Yugoslav First League, FK Sarajevo, then playing in the Premier League of Bosnia and Herzegovina. Next he returned to Serbia and played with FK Radnički Niš and FK BASK before joining FK Novi Pazar where he will play 4 seasons, except half season on loan in Iran with F.C. Aboomoslem. He will play again with Javor in 2011, this time in the Serbian SuperLiga, and later will change several clubs such as FK Rudar Kostolac, BASK again, and FK Jošanica. During the winter break of the 2014–15 season he will join Serbian second level side FK Moravac Mrštane after spending the previous half-season with FK Goražde, at time at the top of the First League of the Federation of Bosnia and Herzegovina, one of two second levels in Bosnia.

References

External links
 
 Fuad Salihović stats at utakmica.rs
 Fuad Salihović stats at footballdatabase.eu

1985 births
Living people
Sportspeople from Novi Pazar
Association football midfielders
Serbian footballers
FK Javor Ivanjica players
FK Sarajevo players
FK Radnički Niš players
FK BASK players
FK Novi Pazar players
FK Rudar Kostolac players
FK Goražde players
FK Moravac Mrštane players
Serbian SuperLiga players
Serbian expatriate footballers
Serbian expatriate sportspeople in Iran
Expatriate footballers in Iran
F.C. Aboomoslem players